Wig Wam is a Norwegian rock band that is dedicated to glam metal and imitates the style of typical rock bands from the 1980s movement.

Wig Wam rose to international fame when they represented Norway in the Eurovision Song Contest 2005 with the song "In My Dreams", written by guitarist Teeny, they brought Norway to a ninth place in Kyiv. The song immediately became a huge hit in Norway, being among the most bought singles for 19 weeks and peaking for three weeks at the top of the national single chart , an achievement neither of Norway's two Eurovision winners managed. Also in Iceland, Japan and Sweden it enjoyed moderate to huge commercial success.

Their 2010 Single "Do Ya Wanna taste It?" enjoyed new recognition as the intro theme song of the 2022 TV series Peacemaker.

Studio albums

Live albums

Singles

References 

Discographies of Norwegian artists